Pulmonary bay is a medical term which describes a finding on the chest radiograph. In pulmonary bay, there is a concavity where you would normally find the pulmonary artery. Pulmonary bay is most commonly associated with tetralogy of Fallot, however it may also be seen in other conditions where there is a reduced outflow from the pulmonary artery.

References

Projectional radiography
Thorax (human anatomy)